Mario Antonio Read Vittini (1926–2010) was a politician and diplomat from the Dominican Republic.

Biography
Mario Antonio Read Vittini was born in Hatillo, near San Cristóbal, on 15 May 1926. From his father, he descends from William Augustus Read (1820–1887), an American immigrant from Roxbury, Massachusetts of English and French descent, who married Dominga Rodríguez Isambert, a Dominican of partial French origin. His mother has Corsican ancestry.

Read Vittini became a Doctor of Law in 1948. On 10 June 1952 he became First Secretary for Embassies and Legations.

In 1960 he sought political asylum in the Brazilian embassy and received asylum from the United States and exiled in New York, where he married Carmen Virginia Escobar. He returned to the Dominican Republic after the death of dictator Rafael Trujillo and became the Vice Presidential Candidate of the Democratic Revolutionary Nationalistic Party (Partido Nacionalista Revolucionario Democrático) in the 1962 Dominican Republic general election, despite he co-founded in that year the Social Christian Reformist Party (PRSC). He favoured the coup against Juan Bosch in September 1963.

During the Triumvirate, Read Vittini served as Secretary (Minister) of the Presidency. By 1966 the PRSC had split into three factions and Read Vittini was the leader of one of them: the right-wing party Christian Democratic Party (PDC), which supported Joaquín Balaguer in the 1966 election, but Read declared himself in opposition to Balaguer early in 1968.

Read served as Ambassador from the Dominican Republic to the United States from 1969 to 1970. He later served as Legal consultant of the Executive Branch from 1986 until 1988, when he was designated Secretary (Minister) of Labour.

He also served as the Dominican representative at the Inter-American Development Bank (IDB), and as Governor of the Central Bank of the Dominican Republic from 18 August 1993 to 31 August 1994 with Eligio Bisonó Bisonó as his deputy governor.

Read died from pancreatic cancer on 20 July 2010, aged 84, at his home in Evaristo Morales, Ensanche Quisqueya, in the city of Santo Domingo.

Family tree

References

1926 births
2010 deaths
Ambassadors of the Dominican Republic to the United States
Governors of the Central Bank of the Dominican Republic
Deaths from cancer in the Dominican Republic
Deaths from pancreatic cancer
Dominican Party politicians
Dominican Republic diplomats
20th-century Dominican Republic lawyers
Dominican Republic people of Basque descent
Dominican Republic people of Canarian descent
Dominican Republic people of English descent
Dominican Republic people of European American descent
Dominican Republic people of French descent
Government ministers of the Dominican Republic
People from San Cristóbal, Dominican Republic
Social Christian Reformist Party politicians